The Reading Municipal Light and Power Station is a historic municipal power station building at 226 Ash Street in Reading, Massachusetts.  The single story brick building was built in 1894 after the town decided to build a municipal power station.  The Romanesque style building was designed by George E. Abbott, and housed power generating equipment until 1925, when it was converted to housing power switching equipment.  It now houses municipal offices.

The building was added to the National Register of Historic Places in 1984.

See also

National Register of Historic Places listings in Reading, Massachusetts
National Register of Historic Places listings in Middlesex County, Massachusetts

References

External links
RMLD - History of Reading Municipal Light Department

Energy infrastructure completed in 1894
Buildings and structures in Reading, Massachusetts
Coal-fired power stations in Massachusetts
Industrial buildings and structures on the National Register of Historic Places in Massachusetts
National Register of Historic Places in Reading, Massachusetts
1894 establishments in Massachusetts
Energy infrastructure on the National Register of Historic Places